The Haunted Manor is a silent drama film released in 1916. It was produced by Gaumont Film Company and released through the Mutual Film Company. Filming took place in Jacksonville and St. Augustine, Florida. It was directed by Edwin Middleton. Part of the movie plot is set in India.

It is the first film known to include Earl Schenck.

Cast
 Iva Shepard
 Earl Schenck
 Henry W. Pemberton
 William H. Hopkins
 Gertrude Robinson
 Robert Clugston
 Olive Trevor, her film debut

References

1916 films
American silent feature films
American black-and-white films
Films directed by Edwin Middleton
1916 drama films
Films shot in India
Films shot in Jacksonville, Florida
1910s American films
Silent American drama films